The 1926 Delaware State Hornets football team represented Delaware State University in the 1926 college football season as an independent. In the school's third season, Delaware State compiled a 1–0 record, winning their only game against Downingtown Industrial and Agricultural.

Schedule

References

Delaware State
Delaware State Hornets football seasons
College football undefeated seasons
Delaware State Hornets football